Mount Owen is a  summit in British Columbia, Canada.

Description
Mount Owen is located in Yoho National Park, in the Bow Range of the Canadian Rockies. Precipitation runoff from Mount Owen drains into tributaries of the Ottertail River which in turn is a tributary of the Kicking Horse River. The nearest higher neighbor is Odaray Mountain,  to the north-northeast.

History

The first ascent of the mountain was made in 1892 by Canadian surveyor James J. McArthur who named the mountain for his survey party member, Frank Owen. The mountain's toponym was officially adopted on March 31, 1924, by the Geographical Names Board of Canada.

Geology

Mount Owen is composed of sedimentary rock laid down during the Precambrian to Jurassic periods. Formed in shallow seas, this sedimentary rock was pushed east and over the top of younger rock during the Laramide orogeny.

Climate

Based on the Köppen climate classification, Mount Owen is located in a subarctic climate zone with cold, snowy winters, and mild summers. Winter temperatures can drop below −20 °C with wind chill factors below −30 °C. This climate supports a small unnamed glacier on the north slope.

See also
Geography of British Columbia

References

External links
 Mount Owen: Weather forecast
 Parks Canada web site: Yoho National Park

Three-thousanders of British Columbia
Canadian Rockies
Mountains of Yoho National Park
Kootenay Land District